Kurakhove is a city in Pokrovsk Raion of Donetsk Oblast (province) of Ukraine. Population: ; 21,479 (2001). At Kurakhove, there is Kurakhove Power Station.

The 11 May 2014 Donetsk Oblast independence referendum was conducted in Kurakhove, but the city did not become part of the territory controlled by the Donetsk People's Republic (who held the referendum).

Gallery

References

Cities in Donetsk Oblast
Cities of district significance in Ukraine
Populated places established in the Ukrainian Soviet Socialist Republic
Pokrovsk Raion